This is a list of Intel Pentium M processors. They are all single-core 32-bit CPUs codenamed Banias and Dothan, and targeted at the consumer market of mobile computers.

Mobile processors

Pentium M

"Banias" (130 nm)   
 All models support: MMX, SSE, SSE2, Enhanced Intel SpeedStep Technology (EIST)
 Die size: 83 mm²

"Dothan" (90 nm)   
 All models support: MMX, SSE, SSE2, Enhanced Intel SpeedStep Technology (EIST)
 PAE, XD bit (an NX bit implementation): supported by C0 stepping
 Die size: 87 mm²
 Steppings: B0, B1, C0
C1 stepping Pentium M's are fabbed on a 65 nm process with an actual C0 stepping

See also

 List of Intel Pentium processors
  List of Intel Pentium 4 processors § Mobile processors
 Pentium M (microarchitecture)

References 

Pentium M
Intel Pentium M